Catherine Duddy Wood (born November 26, 1955) is an American investor and the founder, CEO and CIO of Ark Invest, an investment management firm.

Early life and education
Wood was born in Los Angeles, the eldest child of immigrants from Ireland. Wood's father served in the Irish Army and the United States Air Force as a radar systems engineer. In 1974, Wood graduated from Notre Dame Academy in Los Angeles, an all-girls Catholic high school. In 1981, Wood graduated summa cum laude from the University of Southern California, with a Bachelor of Science degree in finance and economics. One of Wood's professors was economist Arthur Laffer, who became Wood's mentor.

Career
In 1977, via her mentor Arthur Laffer, Wood got a job as an assistant economist at Capital Group, where she worked for three years. In 1980, she moved to New York City to take a job at Jennison Associates as chief economist, analyst, portfolio manager and managing director. She worked there for 18 years. In the early 1980s, she debated Henry Kaufman on why she believed interest rates had peaked.

In 1998, along with Lulu C. Wang, Wood co-founded Tupelo Capital Management, a hedge fund based in New York City.

In 2001, she joined AllianceBernstein as chief investment officer of global thematic strategies, where she worked for 12 years, managing $5 billion. She was criticized for performing worse than the overall market during the financial crisis of 2007–2008.

In 2014, after her idea for actively managed exchange-traded funds based on disruptive innovation was deemed too risky by AllianceBernstein, Wood left the company and founded Ark Invest. The company is named after the Ark of the Covenant; Wood was reading the One-Year Bible at the time. ARK's first four ETFs were seeded with capital from Bill Hwang of Archegos Capital.

Wood was named the best stock picker of 2020 by Bloomberg News editor-in-chief emeritus Matthew A. Winkler.

As of March 2021, two funds run by Wood were on the list of the 10 largest female-run funds by total net assets.

As of 31 December 2021, Cathie Wood's ARK'S ETFs came in fifth place among Morningstar’s list of top 10 wealth-destroying funds compiled by portfolio strategist Amy C. Arnott, and ranked just below investment vehicles from Credit Suisse, ALPS, Kraneshares, and Barclay.

As of December, 2022, Wood's flagship fund, Ark Innovation, had lagged behind the S&P 500 for five years, dropping in value by more than 80% from last year's peak.

March 16, 2023 Cathie Wood's Ark launches private crypto fund, raising $16.3 million

Awards and honors

Wood was selected for the inaugural 2021 Forbes 50 Over 50; made up of entrepreneurs, leaders, scientists and creators who are over the age of 50.

Personal life
Wood lives in Wilton, Connecticut. She was divorced from Robert Wood, who died in 2018. She has three children: Caitlin, Caroline, and Robert.

Wood is a devout Christian. During the 2020 election, she warned that Joe Biden's plan of taxation and regulation would stifle innovation. Wood also has a large following on Reddit.

In 2018, she donated funds to her high school to start the Duddy Innovation Institute, which encourages girls to study disruptive innovation.

References

1955 births
Living people
University of Southern California alumni
American money managers
American women chief executives
Chief investment officers
American people of Irish descent
Catholics from California
Businesspeople from Los Angeles
20th-century American businesspeople
20th-century American businesswomen
21st-century American businesspeople
21st-century American businesswomen
People associated with cryptocurrency
People associated with Bitcoin